Guillaume III may refer to:

 William II, Count of Eu (died 1096) 
 William III, Count of Ponthieu (c. 1095–1172)

See also
William III (disambiguation)